The boiling point of a substance is the temperature at which it can change its state from a liquid to a gas.

Boiling point may also refer to:

Film and TV 
 Boiling Point (1990 film), a Japanese film by Takeshi Kitano
 Boiling Point (1993 film), an American action film starring Wesley Snipes and Dennis Hopper
 Boiling Points, a television series broadcast by MTV in the United States
 Boiling Point (miniseries), a 1999 miniseries about celebrity chef Gordon Ramsay
 "Boiling Point" (Casualty), an episode of the BBC TV series Casualty
 Boiling Point (2021 film), a British film starring Stephen Graham.

Other 
 Boiling Point, California, an unincorporated community in the Mojave Desert
 Boiling Point (EP), a 2012 EP by Tech N9ne
 Boiling Point: Road to Hell, a 2005 PC video game developed by Deep Shadow, previously known as Xenus
 "Boiling Point", a song by Obituary from the 1994 album World Demise
 Boiling Point (2012), a professional wrestling event